John Woodhouse (5 December 1888 – 1958) was an English professional footballer who played as a right half in the Southern League and the Football League for Brighton & Hove Albion. He was called up to play for the FA XI on a tour of South Africa in 1920.

Personal life 
Woodhouse served as a private with the 17th and 13th Battalions of the Middlesex Regiment during the First World War. At the time of his enlistment, he was living in Hove with his wife.

Career statistics

References

1888 births
1958 deaths
Sportspeople from Smethwick
English footballers
Association football wing halves
Brighton & Hove Albion F.C. players
Southern Football League players
English Football League players
British Army personnel of World War I
Middlesex Regiment soldiers
Date of death missing
Military personnel from Staffordshire